The Yellow Sea is a 2010 South Korean action thriller film directed by Na Hong-jin and starring  Ha Jung-woo and Kim Yoon-seok in the lead roles. This film marks the reunion of the director and the lead actors who also first collaborated for the 2008 film The Chaser, in which Ha Jung-woo played the antagonist and Kim Yoon-seok played the protagonist. In The Yellow Sea, Ha Jung-woo plays the protagonist while Kim Yoon-seok plays the antagonist.

The film revolves around a cab driver who agrees to carry out a hit on a professor in exchange for getting his debts paid. He soon becomes a fugitive after the hit goes wrong, and is chased by both the police and the gangster who assigned him the task.

The Yellow Sea was released in South Korea on 22 December 2010.

Plot
In northeastern Chinese city of Yanji in Yanbian Prefecture, Gu-nam (Ha Jung-woo), an ethnic Korean, or Joseonjok, toils away as a taxi driver. When not working, he is often found at gambling halls. Gu-nam is now in serious debt. His wife left to work in South Korea and promised to send money back. He has yet to hear from her and is tormented by nightmares of her having an extra-marital affair. To make matters worse, Gu-nam is fired from his job and debt collectors take most of his severance pay.

Local gangster, Myun Jung-hak (Kim Yoon-seok), offers him a deal: if Gu-nam goes to South Korea to kill a professor named Kim Seung-hyun, he will get .

When Gu-nam arrives in South Korea, he carefully scopes out his target for days, while also searching for his wife. The night before his boat is due to return to China, Gu-nam witnesses Kim Seung-hyun being ambushed and killed by his driver and two accomplices inside his apartment building's stairwell. After fending off the driver, Gu-nam cuts off Seung-hyun's thumb, as per Mr. Myun's contract, but is spotted by Seung-hyun's wife and is forced to flee the police. Upon arriving at the supposed location for the boat back to China, there is no one to pick Gu-nam up, and he realizes he's been set up. It is revealed that a businessman named Kim Tae-won had hired the driver to kill Seung-hyun. Tae-won turns his gang's attention to finding Gu-nam. After discovering that Gu-nam was hired by Myun, Tae-won sends his men to China to have Myun killed as well, but Myun kills them and instead returns to Korea to force a meeting with Tae-won. They strike a deal, with Tae-won promising to pay out Myun for finding and killing Gu-nam.

On the run from the police, Gu-nam abducts and interrogates one of Myun's smugglers and arranges a return to China via cargo ship. At the same time, he sees reports on TV that a woman matching the description of his wife had been killed by a man he had investigated as being connected to his wife earlier. Gu-nam hires an outside investigator to check the body and confirm if the woman killed was his wife, and when the investigator cannot tell if it is her, he lies to Gu-nam and arranges to have the woman cremated and the ashes delivered to Gu-nam.

After arriving at the cargo ship, Gu-nam realizes he has been set up yet again and is cornered by Myun's men and almost killed, but is able to escape. Some of Myun's men are arrested and point the police towards Tae-won, who sends men to the apartment complex Myun and his crew is staying at to have him killed. The rest of Myun's crew are killed, but Myun defeats Tae-won's crew, burns down the complex, and leaves to find Tae-won. Gu-nam returns to Seung-hyun's apartment, promising to Seung-hyun's wife to kill the man responsible for having her husband murdered. Myun ambushes Tae-won at his gang's headquarters, and after a lengthy conflict, the two are mortally wounded. During Gu-nam's search, he is ambushed and abducted by two goons, but kills them and retrieves a business card off of one of the goons for a banker who had been in contact with Myun. Gu-nam arrives at the station and stands over the dying Tae-won, who mumbles that Seung-hyun had an affair with his wife. Myun passes out at the wheel of his van and crashes at the station entrance, and dies from his wounds. At a restaurant, a wounded Gu-nam meets with the man who helped identify his wife and is given her ashes. After following the business card to a bank, he leaves after seeing Seung-hyun's wife talking to the banker who had hired Myun, deducing that she had hired him to kill her own husband. Both Tae-won and Seung-hyun's wife had put the hit on Seung-hyun; Tae-won for having an affair with his wife, Seung-hyun's wife for cheating.

Gu-nam heads to a pier and takes a fisherman hostage and orders him to go to Yanbian. While on the boat, he has a vision of his wife leaving on a train; he succumbs to his wounds en route back to China. The fisherman then dumps Gu-nam's body and the ashes in the water. In an ambiguous mid-credit scene, Gu-nam's wife arrives home by train.

Cast

 Ha Jung-woo as Gu-nam
 Kim Yoon-seok as Myun Jung-hak
 Jo Sung-ha as Tae-won
 Lee Chul-min as Choi Sung-nam
 Kwak Do-won as Prof. Kim Seung-hyun
 Lim Ye-won as Prof. Kim's wife
 Tak Sung-eun as Gu-nam's wife
 Kim Ki-hwan as Prof. Kim's driver
 Ki Se-hyung as Tae-won's subordinate
 Lee El as Joo-young, Tae-won's mistress
 Oh Yoon-hong as Tae-won's wife
 Jung Man-sik as Detective
 Jung Min-sung as Detective
 Kim Dong-hyun as Detective
 Park Byung-eun as bank employee
 Jang So-yeon as employee at Do-man Hotel
 Yang Ki-won as detective
 Sung Byoung-sook as Gu-nam's mother
 Kong Jung-hwan as Jeon Pil-kyoo
 Baek Won-gil as Korean-Chinese kidnapper 1
 Kang Hyun-joong as Busan port sailor
 Yoo Ha-bok as Yanbian taxi boss
 Lee Hee-joon as policeman
 Lee Jun-hyeok as dog seller 2
 Kim Jae-hwa as Jung-hak's girlfriend (uncredited)

Release
The film was screened in the Un Certain Regard section at the 2011 Cannes Film Festival, as well as the 2011 Filmfest München.

The Australian and UK films rights were sold to Bounty Films. The UK release of the film was on October 21, 2011.

Reception
The film opened on December 22, 2010 in South Korea and was top of the box office, selling 1.05 million tickets in its first five days of release, according to the Korean Film Council. The film sold a total of 2,142,742 tickets nationwide.

The film received positive critical reviews. The review aggregator website Rotten Tomatoes reported that 88% of 25 critics have given the film a positive reviews. On review aggregator website Metacritic, the film has a weighted average score of 70 out of 100 based on 19 critics, indicating "generally positive reviews".

Mark Olsen of The Los Angeles Times wrote "A breakneck mix of bone-crunching freneticism and bloody close-quarters knife-fighting with a strand of romantic melancholy". 	
The New York Times'''s Manohla Dargis wrote "A rush of a movie from South Korea that slips and slides from horror to humor on rivers of blood and offers the haunting image of a man, primitive incarnate, beating other men with an enormous, gnawed-over meat bone." 	The Hollywood Reporter's Maggie Lee stated "The raging stamina, unrelenting violence, rapid-fire editing and truncated narrative all give one no pause for thought or even breath. By the time the central mystery is revealed in a nice twist, it gets swallowed in the messy, anti-climactic end." Peter Bradshaw of The Guardian added "This noirish South Korean gangster film is a deafening explosion of energy, gruesome violence and chaos that, despite its implausibilities, has brashness and style... Perhaps The Yellow Sea does not really hang together, and, yes, it could perhaps have lost 30 minutes. But its power and bite-strength are impressive." Philip Kemp of GamesRadar+ gave the film two stars out of five, stating "At nearly two and a half hours long, The Yellow Sea is overkill in every sense." Michael Atkinson of The Village Voice'' mentioned "If anything, Na's film is too much of a good thing, exceeding credibility too often (the punching-bag hero is far too lucky - good and bad - and absorbs a hilarious amount of punishment) in its pursuit of despairing violence. But that's the Korean way, and Na nails down the bottom feeder realism while slouching toward video-game hyperbole".

Awards and nominations

References

External links 
  (UK)
 
 
 
 

2010 films
2010 action drama films
2010 action thriller films
2010s chase films
South Korean action drama films
South Korean action thriller films
Films about contract killing
South Korean neo-noir films
Films set in Jilin
Films set in Yanbian
Films shot in China
Films directed by Na Hong-jin
Showbox films
20th Century Fox films
South Korean chase films
2010s Korean-language films
2010s South Korean films